The 2019 North Carolina Central Eagles football team represented North Carolina Central University in the 2019 NCAA Division I FCS football season. They were led by first-year head coach Trei Oliver. The Eagles played their home games at O'Kelly–Riddick Stadium. They were a member of the Mid-Eastern Athletic Conference (MEAC). They finished the season 4–8, 3–5 in MEAC play to finish in sixth place.

Previous season

The Eagles finished the 2018 season 5–6, 3–4 in MEAC play to finish in a tie for sixth place.

Preseason

MEAC poll
In the MEAC preseason poll released on July 26, 2019, the Eagles were predicted to finish in fifth place.

Preseason All–MEAC teams
The Eagles had seven players selected to the preseason all-MEAC teams.

First Team Offense

Isaiah Totten – RB

Second Team Offense

Andrew Dale – OL

Third Team Offense

Somadina Okezie-Okeke – C

Ricky Lee – OL

First Team Defense

Darius Royster – DL

Kawuan Cox – DL

Third Team Defense

Branden Bailey – LB

Schedule

Game summaries

at Austin Peay

at Towson

at Gardner–Webb

Elizabeth City State

at Morgan State

at Florida A&M

Bethune–Cookman

Delaware State

at Howard

Norfolk State

South Carolina State

at North Carolina A&T

References

North Carolina Central
North Carolina Central Eagles football seasons
North Carolina Central Eagles football